The 2004–2005 Jordan League was the 53rd season of Jordan Premier League, the top-flight league for Jordanian association football clubs. The championship was won by Al-Wehdat, while Al-Ahli and That Ras were relegated. A total of 10 teams participated.

Teams

Map

League standings

References

2003
Jordan
1